Cara Tanamachi, better known as Cara Lockwood, is a bestselling American novelist from Mesquite, Texas.

Career
Tanamachi's novels identify primarily with the romance and chick lit genres. As Cara Lockwood, her most successful book was I Do (But I Don't), which was a USA Today bestseller and was made into a Lifetime Original Movie of the same name starring Denise Richards and Dean Cain.

Tanamachi also wrote the Bard Academy teen series, updating her favorite classics. Titles include Wuthering High, Scarlet Letterman, and Moby Clique.

Personal life
Tanamachi graduated from Mesquite High School in Texas and from the University of Pennsylvania, where she majored in English studies.

Tanamachi wrote most of her novels using her husband's surname, Lockwood, and began writing under her maiden name after her divorce. She has two children from her first marriage and three stepchildren from her second.

Bibliography

As Cara Lockwood 
Adult novels
 Crandell Sisters Series
 I Do (But I Don't) (Gallery Books, 2003)
 I Did (But I Wouldn't Now) (Gallery Books, 2006)
 Pink Slip Party (Gallery Books, 2004)
 Dixieland Sushi (Gallery Books, 2005)
 In One Year and Out the Other (editor, Pocket Books, 2006)
 Demon Series
 Every Demon Has His Day (Downtown Press, 2009)
 Can't Teach an Old Demon New Tricks (Downtown Press, 2010)
 Follow Me (Harlequin, 2013; 5-part serial)
 Boys and Toys (Harlequin, 2015)
 Texting Under the Influence (Harlequin, 2015)
 Her Hawaiian Homecoming (Harlequin, 2015)
 The Big Break (Harlequin, 2016)
 Shelter in the Tropics (Harlequin, 2017)
 The Shark and I (Audible, 2017)
 Island of Second Chances (Harlequin, 2018)
 Practicing Parenthood (Harlequin, 2018)
 Dater's Handbook (Hallmark Publishing, 2018; novelization of the Hallmark Channel Original Movie)
 No Strings (Harlequin, 2018)
 Look at Me (Harlequin, 2018)
 Trick and Treat (Harlequin, 2018)
 First Class Sin (Harlequin, 2019)
 Cuffs (Harlequin, 2020)
 The Sex Cure (Harlequin, 2020)
 The Love Cure (Harlequin, 2021)
 Masquerade (Harlequin, 2021)
Young adult novels
 Bard Academy Series
 Wuthering High (MTV Books, 2006)
 The Scarlet Letterman (MTV Books, 2007)
 Moby Clique (MTV Books, 2008)
 A Tale of Two Proms (self-published, 2011)

As Cara Tanamachi 

 The Second You're Single (St. Martin's Press, 2023)

References

External links

Official Site of Cara Tanamachi
Official Site of Cara Lockwood

21st-century American novelists
American women novelists
American chick lit writers
People from Mesquite, Texas
Novelists from Texas
University of Pennsylvania alumni
Living people
21st-century American women writers
Year of birth missing (living people)